The Fujifilm GFX100S is a mirrorless medium format camera produced by Fujifilm with Fujifilm G-mount. It is a smaller version of the 2019 GFX100 camera. The camera was announced by the corporation on January 27, 2021 at the X Summit Global 2021 together with the X-E4. Sales began in March 2021.

The camera uses a 102MP 43.8 x 32.9 mm medium format sensor with 100% phase-detection autofocus coverage. It also has a Pixel Shift Multi-Shot capability, allowing the camera to move its sensor to create ultra-high resolution 400MP images. The GFX100S uses a smaller and lighter in-body image stabilization (IBIS) mechanism with 5-axis stabilization, and is capable of recording 4K video using the full sensor, and can produce raw video with an external recorder.

Compared with the GFX100, the GFX100S is 500 g lighter, 30 percent smaller, with no interchangeable EVF, and no option for a vertical battery grip. The controls feature a traditional DSLR-style dial, as well as a 1.8 inch monochrome top display which can show settings.

The camera is made out of a magnesium-alloy casing, weighing around 900 g and can operate in temperatures as low as -10 °C with a dust and weather-resistant capabilities.

See also 
 Fujifilm GFX100
 Fujifilm G-mount

References 

Fujifilm G-mount cameras
Cameras introduced in 2021